Canoa: A Shameful Memory is a 1976 Mexican drama film directed by Felipe Cazals, based upon the San Miguel Canoa Massacre.

Plot
The film is a dramatic re-enactment of real-life events that took place in 1968 in the small village of San Miguel Canoa in Puebla, México. There a group of five young employees of the Autonomous University of Puebla intended to spend the night en route to a hike up La Malinche. The group was viciously set upon by villagers who had been manipulated by a local right-wing priest to believe them to be Communist revolutionaries and deserved lynching.

The film is shot in a documentary style and examines the pervasive atmosphere of repression in the country following wide-spread protests over the government's spending on the 1968 Summer Olympics, eventually leading to a massacre of hundreds of protestors in Mexico City.

Cast
Enrique Lucero as Priest
Salvador Sánchez as Witness
Ernesto Gómez Cruz as Lucas
Roberto Sosa as Julián
Jaime Garza as Roberto
Arturo Alegro as Ramón
Carlos Chávez as Miguel
Gerardo Vigil as Jesús Carrillo Sánchez
Manuel Ojeda as Town man

Release
It was one of the first movies to express the tone of the time of the setting: Mexico 1968, when student turmoils were spread across the country. It was entered into the 26th Berlin International Film Festival, where it won the Silver Bear - Special Jury Prize.

Reception
The film was both a critical and a box-office success. Mexican filmmakers Guillermo del Toro and Alfonso Cuarón have praised the film.

References

External links

Canoa: A Shameful Memory: The Devil in Disguise an essay by Fernanda Solórzano at the Criterion Collection

1976 films
1976 drama films
1970s adventure drama films
1970s Spanish-language films
Films directed by Felipe Cazals
Mexican adventure drama films
Silver Bear Grand Jury Prize winners
1970s Mexican films